The men's tournament of volleyball at the 2011 Pan American Games in Guadalajara, Mexico will begin on October 24 and end on October 29. All games will be held at the Pan American Volleyball Complex. The defending champions are Brazil.

Teams

Qualification
The following nations qualified for the men's tournament:

Squads
At the start of tournament, all eight participating countries had 12 players on their rosters. Final squads for the tournament are due on September 14, 2011, a month before the start of 2011 Pan American Games.

Preliminary round
All times are local Central Daylight Time (UTC-5)

Group A

Group B

Elimination round

Championship bracket

5th–8th places bracket

Quarterfinals

Fifth to eighth place classification

Seventh place match

Fifth place match

Semifinals

Bronze medal match

Gold medal match

Final standings

Awards
MVP: 
Best Scorer:
Best Spiker: 
Best Blocker:
Best Server: 
Best Digger: 
Best Setter: 
Best Receiver: 
Best Libero:

Medalists

References

External links
Competition Format and Match Schedule
Official website

Volleyball at the 2011 Pan American Games
Pan American Games - Men